Jonathan Hasson Wallace (October 31, 1824 – October 28, 1892) was an American lawyer and politician who served briefly as a United States Congressman from Ohio from 1884 to 1885. He is known for winning his seat in Congress in a contested election over incumbent Republican congressman, and future U.S. President, William McKinley in a contentious vote. The dispute over the outcome of the election rose all the way to the U.S. House, which named Wallace the winner.

Biography 
Wallace was born in St. Clair Township, Columbiana County, Ohio.  He graduated from Washington College (now Washington and Jefferson College), Washington, Pennsylvania in 1844. He studied law in the office of Benjamin Stanton, and eventually became the prosecuting attorney of Columbiana County in 1851 and 1853.

Congress 
He successfully contested as a Democrat the election of William McKinley, to the Forty-eighth United States Congress and served from May 27, 1884, to March 3, 1885.  He ran again in 1884 and lost.

Later career and death 
He was appointed judge of the court of common pleas by Ohio Governor George Hoadly on March 5, 1885, to fill a vacancy and served one year; he continued the practice of law until his death in Lisbon, Ohio.  He was interred in Lisbon Cemetery.

Wallace married Elizabeth L. McCook of Columbiana County in August, 1848, and had four children.

References

External links

1824 births
1892 deaths
People from Columbiana County, Ohio
Washington & Jefferson College alumni
County district attorneys in Ohio
Ohio lawyers
19th-century American politicians
19th-century American lawyers
Democratic Party members of the United States House of Representatives from Ohio